It's Such a Beautiful Day is a 2012 American experimental animated film directed, written, animated, photographed, and produced by Don Hertzfeldt, his first feature film.

The film is divided into three chapters, all of which were originally released in theaters as animated short films. The first part, Everything Will Be OK, was released in 2006 and received the Grand Prize at the Sundance Film Festival. The second short, I Am So Proud of You, was released in 2008, and the titular third film, It's Such a Beautiful Day, was released in 2011. The three short films received over 90 film festival awards upon their original releases. In 2012, Hertzfeldt seamlessly edited all three chapters together and it was released as a new feature film.

Many film critics listed the feature film version as one of the best films of 2012, and the L.A. Film Critics Association named it runner-up for Best Animated Film of the year. Since then, It's Such a Beautiful Day has appeared on several film critics' "Best Of" lists, including #1 on the Film Stage's list of "The 50 Best Animated Films of the 21st Century Thus Far", #1 on The Wrap's list of the "Best Animated Films of the 2010s", and #1 on IGN's list of the "Top 10 Animated Films of All Time".

The movie tells the story of a character named Bill, who struggles with failing memory and surreal visions, among other symptoms of an unknown neurological problem. The film employs both offbeat humor and serious philosophical musings.

Plot 
Bill is a young man whose daily routines, perceptions, and dreams are illustrated onscreen through multiple split-screen windows, which are in turn narrated (by Don Hertzfeldt). Bill suffers from an unnamed illness which interferes with his seemingly mundane life. Bill often has meetings with his ex-girlfriend and had been recently referred to a clinic for his condition. He begins to have intense hallucinations, falling deeper into his illness.

To recuperate, Bill's mother comes to take care of him. Bill is then taken to a hospital, where his health fluctuates, confusing his doctor. Bill's doctor concludes that Bill will not die, surprising and inconveniencing his relatives. Bill then goes back to work.

The film flashes back to Bill's childhood, with the Narrator explaining the death of Bill's half-brother Randall, who disappeared into the sea as a child. After Randall's death, Bill's mother soon became fiercely protective of Bill and rarely left home, eventually causing Bill's stepfather to leave. The Narrator also details the history of Bill's family, many of whom died young in odd or unpleasant ways.

A few days after leaving the hospital, Bill receives a call telling him that his mother had died in a "fit of senile hysterics." Bill sees his doctor again, unexpectedly finding nothing wrong with him. On his way to lunch, Bill suffers a seizure and collapses. During the seizure, various memories of his infancy and childhood flash before him. Bill is again taken to the hospital, where his ex-girlfriend frequently visits him. Bill's new doctor questions him, revealing that Bill cannot remember basic information about his life. Bill has a brain exam, after which he is asked various questions and shown photographs that appear irregular or nonsensical.

Bill's doctor explains that Bill is having trouble understanding past tense and present tense, and it is implied that many of his childhood memories and family history could have been confabulated. Bill is allowed to go home for family care but, when he arrives home, no one is there to take care of him. He starts to repeat and then forget various tasks, such as buying food and taking walks, and he does not seem to understand that he is ill. Bill's doctor explains that he doesn't have long to live.

Bill's outlook on life starkly changes, and he notices more of life's small details. This change is complemented by a change in the film's animation: full-color photography is merged into the scenery. Bill rents a car and drives to his childhood home on instinct. His uncle gives him an address to where he can find his real father, whom he has not seen since childhood. Bill shares a tender moment with his father, forgiving him. The Narrator explains that they will never see each other again. Bill continues driving on, more frenzied now, and stops in a forest. He lies down underneath a tree, and the screen cuts to black.

The Narrator realizes that Bill may die there and refuses to believe that he will. Instead, Bill seems to become immortal. He outlives the human race and the earth's future inhabitants, surviving until the slow death of the universe, watching the stars blink out one at a time.

Production 
Six years in the making, the completed picture was captured entirely in camera on a 35mm rostrum animation stand. Built in the 1940s and used by Hertzfeldt on every project since 1999, it was one of the last surviving cameras of its kind still operating worldwide. The picture blended traditional hand-drawn animation, experimental optical effects, trick photography, and digital hybrids that were printed for photography, one frame at a time.

The film's signature "split screen" effect was achieved by framing the drawn animation through tiny holes placed beneath the camera lens during photography, with each element in the film frame individually composited through careful multiple exposures.

Towards the end of production of the final chapter, the old camera's motor began to fail. It could no longer advance the film properly, riddling the final reels with unintentional light leaks.

Release 
The three chapters of the film were originally produced and released as three animated short films, photographed entirely on 35mm film with in-camera special effects. The three short films were edited together and re-released for the first time as the full-length It's Such a Beautiful Day in 2012.

The first installment, Everything Will Be OK, was released theatrically in 2006 and won the 2007 Sundance Film Festival Grand Prize for Short Film. Despite the film's short running length, Variety film critic Robert Koehler named Everything Will Be OK one of the "Best Films of 2007". The film was extremely well received by critics, describing it as "essential viewing" and, "simply one of the finest shorts produced over the past few years, be it animated or not." The Boston Globe called the film a "masterpiece" with the Boston Phoenix declaring Hertzfeldt a "genius." The short film was a cover story on the Chicago Reader, receiving four stars from critic J.R. Jones.

Everything Will Be OK advanced to the final round of voting for Best Animated Short Film at the 2007 Academy Awards, but did not make the final list of five nominees.

Outside of theaters, Everything Will Be OK was first released as a limited edition DVD "single" in 2007. The DVD featured an extensive "archive" of over 100 pages of deleted scenes, Don's production notes, sketches, and layouts, as well as a hidden Easter egg that plays an alternate, narration-free version of the film to highlight the sound design.

The second installment, I Am So Proud of You was released theatrically in 2008. It continued the dark and philosophical humor of the first film, seeing Bill's recovery haunted by the apparently genetic inevitability of his mental illness, the lack of control over his own fate, and the sudden death of a loved one. The short suggests "simultaneous" connections throughout time, through his strange family history, his childhood, the present, and his old age.

For the first time, Hertzfeldt embarked on a solo tour with the film, presenting a special "Evening with Don Hertzfeldt" program in multiple cities.

I Am So Proud of You received similar critical praise and received 27 film festival awards, including the Grand Jury Prize at the Florida Film Festival and the Golden Starfish at the Hamptons Film Festival.

Director David Lowery wrote, "I Am So Proud Of You is, I think, as good a pick as any for film of the year... full of grand and complex thoughts about life and death and bodily fluids and years rapidly advancing, coming to ends and beginnings, back and forth, over and over, until one slips indistinguishably into the next." Chris Robinson, author and director of the Ottawa International Animation Festival described I Am So Proud of You as "a masterpiece."

Following its theatrical release, a DVD "single" of I Am So Proud of You was released in August 2009, featuring another extensive "archive" of production materials.

The final chapter of the trilogy, It's Such a Beautiful Day, was released in 2011, winning several awards, including a Special Jury Prize from the Hiroshima Animation Festival.

In 2011 and 2012, Hertzfeldt again toured the United States and Canada to support the final chapter in another "Evening with Don Hertzfeldt" program. While this theatrical program presented all three of the short films together for the first time, it still presented them as individual shorts, not yet as a unified feature film.

The final, unified feature film version, It's Such a Beautiful Day, shared the same title as the third short film and had a more limited theatrical release in 2012. It was nominated for Best Animated Feature Film by the Los Angeles Film Critics Association. It later became available on DVD, Vimeo On-Demand, iTunes, and streamed for a two year period on Netflix.

In 2015, a Blu-ray of the remastered, feature-length version of It's Such a Beautiful Day was released.

In 2021, the film was released on the Criterion Channel.

It's Such a Beautiful Day is also available to stream on-demand on Vimeo as of 2022.

Reception

Critical response
It's Such a Beautiful Day was acclaimed by film critics. On review aggregator Rotten Tomatoes, the film holds an approval rating of 100% based on 32 reviews, with an average rating of 8.5/10. The website's critical consensus reads, "A collection of three shorts by Don Hertzfeldt, It's Such a Beautiful Day is an impossibly dense and affecting piece of animated art." On Metacritic the film has a weighted average score of 90 out of 100, based on 7 reviews, indicating "universal acclaim".

Steven Pate of The Chicagoist wrote of the trilogy, "There is a moment in each installment of Don Hertzfeldt's masterful trilogy of animated shorts where you feel something in your chest. It's an unmistakably cardiac event that great art can elicit when something profound and undeniably true is conveyed about the human condition. That's when you say to yourself: are stick figures supposed to make me feel this way? In the hands of a master, yes. And Hertzfeldt is to stick figures what Franz Liszt was to planks of ebony and ivory and what Ted Williams was to a stick of white ash: someone so transcendentally expert that to describe what they do in literal terms is borderline demeaning."

Mike McCahill of The Guardian called it "Funny, oddly affecting and cherishably personal: in a better world, this would be on 300 screens, and filler such as The Croods would have to be smuggled in under the radar."
Paul Bradshaw of Total Film called it "An existential flip book and a heartbreaking black joke: stickmen have never looked so alive."
Glenn Heath Jr. of Little White Lies gave it 5 out of 5 and called it "One of the great films about memory, perspective, and past history."

Accolades 
The Los Angeles Film Critics Association named it their runner-up for Best Animated Feature Film of the year, behind Frankenweenie. Indiewire ranked Hertzfeldt the 9th best Film Director of the Year in its annual poll (tied with Wes Anderson), and film critics for The A.V. Club ranked the film #8 on their list of the Best Films of 2012. Slate Magazine named It's Such a Beautiful Day their pick for Best Animated Feature Film of 2012.

In the United Kingdom, the film was ranked #3 on Time Out London's list of the 10 Best Films of 2013 and #4 on The London Film Review's list of the same. In 2014, Time Out ranked It's Such a Beautiful Day #16 on their list of the "100 Best Animated Movies Ever Made." Critic Tom Huddleston described it as "one of the great outsider artworks of the modern era, at once sympathetic and shocking, beautiful and horrifying, angry and hilarious, uplifting and almost unbearably sad."

In 2016, The Film Stage critics ranked the film #1 on their list of the "Best Animated Films of the 21st Century (So Far)." That same year, three critics polled by the BBC named It's Such a Beautiful Day one of the greatest films made since 2000.

In 2019, The Wrap named It's Such a Beautiful Day the #1 "Best Animated Film of the 2010s." The Vulture film critics also ranked it #12 on their overall list of the "Best Movies of the Decade."

In 2021, IGN's CineFix gave it the #1 spot on their "Top 10 Animated Films of All Time" list.

References

External links
 
 

2010s American films
2010s English-language films
2012 films
American adult animated films
American avant-garde and experimental films
Films about death
Films directed by Don Hertzfeldt
Self-reflexive films